Tumor-associated glycoproteins (TAGs) are glycoproteins found on the surface of many cancer cells. They are mucin-like molecules with a molar mass of over 1000 kDa.

See also
 Tumor-associated glycoprotein 72

References

Glycoproteins
Tumor markers